Christopher Heeschen (born 1966) is a German MD with a PhD. In 2004, he became a professor of Experimental Medicine and Department Head of Medicine at the University of Munich. He has worked at the Spanish National Cancer Research Centre (CNIO) since 2009.

Heeschen was recognized by the Paul-Martini-Award in 2002 for describing a rebound phenomenon in patients with unstable coronary heart disease after the withdrawal of statins.  In 2009, he received the Ritzenhain Award from the German Cancer Research Center.

His most cited article, on cancer stem cells, has been cited 1864 times, according to Google Scholar.

References 

Living people
1966 births
German oncologists
Academic staff of the Ludwig Maximilian University of Munich